Poropuntius burtoni is a species of ray-finned fish in the genus Poropuntius which is common in most of the hils treams draining into the Chindwin river in Manipur.

References 

burtoni
Fish described in 1933